John Inkster (1799 – June 30, 1874) was a Scottish-born merchant and politician in Manitoba. He served as a member of the Council of Assiniboia from 1857 to 1868.

He was born in the Orkney Islands and came to Rupert's Land in 1819 as a stonemason employed by the Hudson's Bay Company. In 1826, he married Mary Sinclair, the daughter of William Sinclair, chief factor of the Hudson's Bay Company. Later, Inkster began farming and also operated as an independent merchant. He operated a water-powered mill and also was president of a company which constructed a steam-powered grist mill. He served as a magistrate, as a petty judge and as auditor of public accounts.

He died at Kildonan in 1874.

His eldest son Colin served in the Legislative Council of Manitoba and was sheriff for Manitoba.

His former home, Seven Oaks House, now operates as a museum.

References 

1799 births
1874 deaths
Members of the Council of Assiniboia